Prodasineura flavifacies is a species of damselfly in the family Protoneuridae. It is endemic to Zambia.

Sources

Fauna of Zambia
Protoneuridae
Insects described in 1981
Taxonomy articles created by Polbot
Taxobox binomials not recognized by IUCN